Jamieson K. Price is an American actor, best known for his deep and booming voice in numerous anime and video games. He is known as the voice of the Count of Monte Cristo in Gankutsuou, Sojiro Sakura in Persona 5, Ovan in .hack//G.U., and Galbalan, and Milton Grimm from Ever After High. Price also had a part in the 2000 movie The Patriot.

Biography

Price became interested in acting as a young child, starting from when he was in the fourth grade and later did theatre performances even during his adolescent and young adult years. In high school, Price got involved with dramatic interpretations-(focusing on poetry and prose reading) as well as voice competitions in his teens and became Virginia State Champion in his senior year of high school which later lead him to get into acting and voice acting by a close friend of his during the late 90s after graduate school. He eventually got a job in the voice acting business by Dorothy Fahn who is a friend of his wife Bethany who was very interested in his deep voice; aside from acting/voice acting, he has also done work for fight choreography as well as a theatrical technician.

Personal life
Price has been married to his wife Bethany Price since December 31, 1993, who works as a director, audition/stage coach, and an acting instructor. He has three children-(2 daughters and 1 son); Dane-(an actor and musician), Cynthia-(an actress and dancer), and Meghan-(a chiropractor). Jamieson Price is also involved with a few podcasts, one of them being Crypto-Z.

Filmography

Anime

===Animation===

Films

Video games

Live action

References

External links
 
 
 

Living people
American male film actors
American male television actors
American male video game actors
American male voice actors
California State University, Long Beach alumni
College of William & Mary alumni
Year of birth missing (living people)
20th-century American male actors
21st-century American male actors